Virtual Obsession is a 1998 science fiction television film directed by Mick Garris and starring Peter Gallagher and Mimi Rogers. It is based on the 1993 novel Host by Peter James.

Premise
Scientist Joe Messenger has created a supercomputer controlling the city's utilities. Juliet Spring, a computer technician who becomes Joe's assistant, is incurably ill and plans to transfer her consciousness to Joe's supercomputer.

Cast
Peter Gallagher as Dr. Joe Messenger
Mimi Rogers as  Karen Messenger
Jake Lloyd as  Jack
Andy Comeau as Tom Inman 
Bridgette Wilson as Juliet Spring
Tom Nibley as Albert
Charles Grueber as Governor
David Jensen as Mayor
Cynthia Garris as Judge 
Frank Gerrish as Coroner
Mary Bishop as Mary Alice
Nicole Guertin as Waitress

Production
Virtual Obsession was filmed in Provo and Salt Lake City, Utah.

Broadcast
The film was first broadcast on ABC on Thursday, February 26, 1998, from 8-11 p.m. It has been rerun on cable TV under the title Host.

External links

References

1998 television films
1998 science fiction films
Films directed by Mick Garris
1998 films
American science fiction television films
Films based on British novels
Films about consciousness transfer
1990s American films